The Treaty Between the United States of America and the Russian Federation on Strategic Offensive Reductions (SORT), also known as the Treaty of Moscow, was a strategic arms reduction treaty between the United States and Russia that was in force from June 2003 until February 2011 when it was superseded by the New START treaty. 

At the time, SORT was positioned as "represent[ing] an important element of the new strategic relationship" between the two countries with both parties agreeing to limit their nuclear arsenal to between 1,700 and 2,200 operationally deployed warheads each. It was signed in Moscow on 24 May 2002. 

After ratification by the U.S. Senate and the State Duma, SORT came into force on 1 June 2003. It would have expired on 31 December 2012 if not superseded by New START. Either party could have withdrawn from the treaty upon giving three months written notice to the other.

Mutual nuclear disarmament
SORT was one in a long line of treaties and negotiations on mutual nuclear disarmament between Russia (and its predecessor, the Soviet Union) and the United States, which includes SALT I (1969–1972), the ABM Treaty (1972), SALT II (1972–1979), the INF Treaty (1987), START I (1991), START II (1993) and New START (2010).

The Moscow Treaty was different from START in that it limited operationally deployed warheads, whereas START I limited warheads through declared attribution to their means of delivery (ICBMs, SLBMs, and Heavy Bombers).

Russian and U.S. delegations met twice a year to discuss the implementation of the Moscow Treaty at the Bilateral Implementation Commission (BIC).

Ratification

The treaty was submitted for ratification in December 2002. However, the passage of the agreement took about a year because the bill had to be resubmitted after its rejection in committee due to concerns about funding for nuclear forces and about cutting systems that had not yet reached the end of their service lives. Further, the deputies were concerned about the U.S.'s ability to upload reserve nuclear warheads for a first strike (upload potential).

The ratification was also problematic because the chairman of the foreign affairs committee of the Duma, Dmitry Rogozin, disagreed with his Federation Council counterpart Margelov. Deputy Rogozin argued that the Moscow Treaty should be delayed because of the 2003 U.S. invasion of Iraq. In the end, however, this delay never happened. The final vote was similar to START II with nearly a third of the deputies voting against. The ratification resolution mandated presidential reporting on nuclear force developments and noted that key legislators should be included in interagency planning.

Implementation
Lawrence Livermore National Laboratory reported that President Bush directed the US military to cut its stockpile of both deployed and reserve nuclear weapons in half by 2012. The goal was achieved in 2007, a reduction of US nuclear warheads to just over 50 percent of the 2001 total. A further proposal by Bush would have brought the total down another 15 percent.

Criticism
While President Bush said the treaty "liquidates the Cold War legacy of nuclear hostility" and his security advisor Condoleezza Rice said it should be considered "the last treaty of the last century," others criticized the treaty for various reasons:
 There were no verification provisions to give confidence, to either the signatories or other parties, that the stated reductions have in fact taken place.
 The arsenal reductions were not required to be permanent; warheads are not required to be destroyed and may therefore be placed in storage and later redeployed.
 The arsenal reductions were required to be completed by 31 December 2012, which is also the day on which the treaty loses all force unless extended by both parties.
 There was a clause in the treaty which provided that withdrawal can occur upon the giving of three months' notice and since no benchmarks are required in the treaty, either side could feasibly perform no actions in furtherance of the treaty and then withdraw in September 2012.

See also
 There have been several other treaties known as the Treaty of Moscow
 Russia and weapons of mass destruction
 United States and weapons of mass destruction
 New START Treaty

Further reading
 Nuclear Files.org Text of the SORT

Footnotes

Arms control treaties
Nuclear weapons
Treaties of the United States
2003 in Russia
2003 in the United States
Nuclear weapons governance
Russia–United States relations
Treaties concluded in 2002
Treaties entered into force in 2003
Treaties of Russia
Presidency of George W. Bush
Vladimir Putin
Nuclear technology treaties